Great Apes is a 1997 novel by Will Self.

Plot synopsis
After a night of drug use, Simon Dykes wakes up in a world where chimpanzees have evolved to be the dominant species with self-awareness, while humans are the equivalent of chimps in our world.

Reviews

"Planet of the Apes meets Nineteen Eighty-Four. Simon Dykes wakes up one morning to a world where chimpanzees are self-aware and humans are the equivalent of chimps in our world. Simon has lived a life of quick drugs, shallow artists and meaningless sex. But this London, much like a PG Tips advert, has chimps in human clothing but with their chimpness intact. The carnivalesque world is humorous, gripping and provocative."

References

External links
Official Will Self site

1997 British novels
Novels by Will Self
1997 science fiction novels
Bloomsbury Publishing books
Fictional chimpanzees